Amblyscirtes fimbriata, the orange-edged roadside skipper, is a species of grass skipper in the butterfly family Hesperiidae.

Subspecies
These two subspecies belong to the species Amblyscirtes fimbriata:
 Amblyscirtes fimbriata fimbriata (Plötz, 1882)
 Amblyscirtes fimbriata pallida H. Freeman, 1993

References

Further reading

External links

Hesperiinae
Articles created by Qbugbot
Butterflies described in 1882